Colleen Piketh ( Webb; born 26 December 1972) is a South African international lawn bowler.

Bowls career
In 2007 she won the singles gold medal at the Atlantic Bowls Championships. In 2011 she won the pairs and fours silver medals at the Atlantic Bowls Championships.

Piketh competed in the women's pairs and the women's singles events at the 2014 Commonwealth Games where she won a gold and bronze medal respectively. She won a gold medal in the women's pairs at the World Bowls Atlantic Bowls Championships in Cyprus in 2015, together with Nici Neal. Piketh also competed in the singles format at the same tournament, losing to Guernsey's Lucy Beere 21-15 in the medal playoff game.

Piketh was part of South Africa's team for the 2018 Commonwealth Games in Gold Coast, Australia where she won a bronze medal in the singles event and a silver medal in the pairs.

She won the 2018 pairs at the South African National Bowls Championships bowling for the George Bowls Club with Elma Davis.

In 2019 she won the pairs gold medal at the Atlantic Bowls Championships and in 2020 she was selected for the 2020 World Outdoor Bowls Championship in Gold Coast, Australia, though this event was postponed until 2021.

In 2021 she won a second women's pairs title at the South African National Bowls Championships, this time partnering Thabelo Muvhango for the Discovery Bowls Club. In 2022, she competed in the women's singles and the women's pairs at the 2022 Commonwealth Games.

References

1972 births
Living people
Bowls players at the 2010 Commonwealth Games
Bowls players at the 2014 Commonwealth Games
Bowls players at the 2018 Commonwealth Games
Bowls players at the 2022 Commonwealth Games
Commonwealth Games medallists in lawn bowls
Commonwealth Games gold medallists for South Africa
Commonwealth Games silver medallists for South Africa
Commonwealth Games bronze medallists for South Africa
South African female bowls players
Sportspeople from Johannesburg
Medallists at the 2014 Commonwealth Games
Medallists at the 2018 Commonwealth Games